The IPE KW-2 Biguá (Brazilian name for the neotropic cormorant bird) is a sailplane that was produced in Brazil in the 1974.

Development

The KW.2 Biguá, an experimental glider, was designed by aeronautical engineer Kuno Widmaier and built jointly by Industria Paranaense de Estruturas and the Aeroclubs of Novo Hamburgo. The two-seat aircraft first flew on December 19, 1974. When the ANAC ordered the IPE Quero Quero, orders for the Biguá were also considered, but ultimately dropped in favor of the IPE 02 Nhapecan. The single machine was used at Novo Hamburgo until 2000. 

The aircraft had a fuselage of welded steel tubes with a conventional tail unit and wings of a wooden construction. The aircraft was partially planked with plywood and covered with fabric, the wings were negatively swept. The pilots sat one behind the other in the enclosed cockpit. Under the fuselage was a skid and a single wheel.

Specifications

See also

References
 
 

Notes

1970s Brazilian sailplanes
1970s Brazilian aircraft
Aircraft first flown in 1974